The 1992 Regal Welsh Open was at the inaugural staging of the professional ranking snooker tournament that took place between 10 and 16 February 1992 at the Newport Leisure Centre in Newport, Wales.

Stephen Hendry won the tournament, defeating Darren Morgan 9–3 in the final.


Main draw

References

Welsh Open (snooker)
1992 in snooker
1990s in Cardiff
Welsh